Mochi are the sub-caste and sub-community of Chamar Caste. Mochi are a community found mainly in the Punjab state of India, in the districts of Patiala, Ludhiana and Nabha. However, the majority of the Mochis in Punjab remain Hindu, with only a smaller minority converting Sikhism. Almost all Sikh Mochi are members of the Ravidasi sect. Most are involved in their traditional occupation of shoemaking and Leather professionals. 

Although the Sikh Mochi practice endogamy and clan exogamy, there are occasional cases of intermarriage with the Chamar community. There clans are referred to as gots from the Sanskrit gotra include the Biswan, Sinh and Suman Mochi.

See also 

 Mochi (Hindu)

References

Social groups of Punjab, India
Social groups of India
Sikh communities
Punjabi tribes